Dragstrip Girl may refer to:
 Dragstrip Girl (1957 film), an American crime drama film
 Dragstrip Girl (1994 film), an American drama film